Scot L. Pollard (born February 12, 1975) is an American former professional basketball player. In an 11-year NBA career, he played for five teams, spending the bulk of his career with the Sacramento Kings and the Indiana Pacers.

Pollard was born in Murray, Utah, and grew up in San Diego and Kennewick, Washington. He attended the University of Kansas and was the 19th pick of the 1997 NBA Draft, selected by the Detroit Pistons. For every season, except his first, Pollard appeared in the NBA Playoffs including in the 2007 NBA Finals with the Cleveland Cavaliers. He won a championship in his final season (2007–08) with the Boston Celtics.

In 2016, Pollard appeared as a contestant in Survivor: Kaôh Rōng, the 32nd season of the American CBS competitive reality television series Survivor. The competition was filmed in Kaoh Rong, Cambodia during the spring of 2015 and premiered on February 17, 2016. He placed 8th, being the 9th person voted off.

Early life and college
Pollard was one of six children in a devout Latter-Day Saint family, but Pollard never embraced the religion. His father, Pearl Pollard, played basketball at the University of Utah. For three years, he played high school basketball at Torrey Pines High School in San Diego before moving to Kennewick, Washington to play for Kamiakin High School most of his senior year. Parade magazine named Pollard a high school All-American in 1993. He eventually graduated from Torrey Pines and attended the University of Kansas, where he graduated in 1997 with a degree in education. While playing NCAA basketball, Pollard finished sixth in Jayhawks history among free throw shooters with 358, fourth in rebounds with 850, and second in blocked shots with 218.

NBA career
Pollard was selected 19th overall in the 1997 NBA Draft by the Detroit Pistons, with whom he debuted during the 1997-98 NBA season. In 33 games with the Pistons, he averaged 2.7 points, 2.2 rebounds, and 0.3 assists per game.

He was traded to the Atlanta Hawks for Christian Laettner, but Pollard never suited up for a game with them and was waived almost a month later. Pollard was traded to the Sacramento Kings, whose management was in the midst of building a successful playoff team at the time. With the Kings he suffered an injury that allowed him to play only for sixteen games during the lockout-shortened 1999 season. It was during his stint with the Kings that he became a solid backup to center Vlade Divac, often starting at power forward when Chris Webber was injured.

Pollard spent the 2002–03 NBA season plagued by injuries. After that season, he was traded to the Indiana Pacers. With the Pacers Pollard had an average of 3.4 rebounds, 3.2 points scored, and 0.4 assists per game. He played an average of about 12 minutes per game.

Pollard's contract with the Pacers expired following the 2005–06 season. On August 18, 2006, Pollard signed a one-year contract with the Cleveland Cavaliers. The Cavaliers lost the 2007 NBA Finals to the San Antonio Spurs four games to none, and Pollard played one minute of game 2.

On August 9, 2007, Pollard signed a one-year contract with the Boston Celtics. Pollard chose #66 as his new uniform number, and jokingly claimed he took it because he would not be allowed to have three 6's. Pollard played limited minutes during the season and saw no playing time during the Celtics championship run in the 2008 NBA Playoffs. He retired shortly after.

Hair styles
Pollard was known across the NBA for his peculiar hairstyles, which included a Mohawk, a single pony tail, a man bun, and a bald head. On January 2, 2006, he introduced a new hairstyle when he wore two pony tails during a Pacers home game against the Seattle SuperSonics.

While with the Sacramento Kings, Pollard received the nickname "Samurai Scot".

Broadcasting career
During the 2007–08 season, Pollard hosted "Planet Pollard," a segment of the show Celtics Now, on Comcast SportsNet. He visited various locales and often gave tours and information about the place he was visiting.

On April 12, 2008, during a game against the Atlanta Hawks, Pollard filled in for color commentator Tom Heinsohn on CSN New England's game telecast. Pollard, who was out for the season after left ankle surgery, has color analyst experience with the Sacramento Kings and WNBA's Sacramento Monarchs. Pollard joined NBA TV in 2009. On October 3, 2014, Mark Boyle announced that Pollard would be joining the Indiana Pacers radio crew.

Acting career
In 2012, Pollard portrayed the titular Axeman in the horror film Axeman at Cutter's Creek. In 2014, he played the role of B. H. Born in the film Jayhawkers.

Survivor
In 2016, Pollard appeared as a contestant on Survivor: Kaôh Rōng, competing in the 32nd season of the competitive reality television series Survivor as part of the To Tang, Gondol, and Dara tribes. Though Kaôh Rōng was the 32nd season to air, it was the 31st filmed, having been shot before Survivor: Cambodia, which aired first; the two seasons were filmed back-to-back in the same location. After developing a well-earned reputation as a bully, he was voted out on Day 27 by a 4–2–2 vote and became the fourth member of the jury. He finished in eighth place, being the ninth person voted off (eleventh person eliminated overall).

NBA career statistics

Regular season

|-
| style="text-align:left;"|
| style="text-align:left;"|Detroit
| 33 || 0 || 9.6 || .500 ||  || .826 || 2.2 || .3 || .2 || .3 || 2.7
|-
| style="text-align:left;"|
| style="text-align:left;"|Sacramento
| 16 || 5 || 16.2 || .541 ||  || .696 || 5.1 || .3 || .5 || 1.1 || 5.1
|-
| style="text-align:left;"|
| style="text-align:left;"|Sacramento
| 76 || 5 || 17.6 || .527 ||  || .717 || 5.3 || .6 || .7 || .8 || 5.4
|-
| style="text-align:left;"|
| style="text-align:left;"|Sacramento
| 77 || 8 || 21.5 || .468 || .000 || .749 || 6.0 || .6 || .6 || 1.3 || 6.5
|-
| style="text-align:left;"|
| style="text-align:left;"|Sacramento
| 80 || 29 || 23.5 || .550 ||  || .693 || 7.1 || .7 || .9 || 1.0 || 6.4
|-
| style="text-align:left;"|
| style="text-align:left;"|Sacramento
| 23 || 0 || 14.1 || .460 ||  || .605 || 4.6 || .3 || .6 || .7 || 4.5
|-
| style="text-align:left;"|
| style="text-align:left;"|Indiana
| 61 || 3 || 11.1 || .412 ||  || .571 || 2.7 || .2 || .4 || .4 || 1.7
|-
| style="text-align:left;"|
| style="text-align:left;"|Indiana
| 49 || 17 || 17.7 || .473 ||  || .673 || 4.2 || .4 || .6 || .5 || 3.9
|-
| style="text-align:left;"|
| style="text-align:left;"|Indiana
| 45 || 32 || 17.1 || .455 ||  || .763 || 4.8 || .5 || .8 || .4 || 3.8
|-
| style="text-align:left;"|
| style="text-align:left;"|Cleveland
| 24 || 0 || 4.5 || .423 ||  || .500 || 1.3 || .1 || .2 || .0 || 1.0
|-
| style="text-align:left; background:#afe6ba;"|
| style="text-align:left;"|Boston
| 22 || 21 || 7.9 || .522 ||  || .682 || 1.7 || .1 || .1 || .3 || 1.8
|- class="sortbottom"
| style="text-align:center;" colspan="2"|Career
| 506 || 99 || 16.5 || .494 || .000 || .709 || 4.6 || .4 || .6 || .7 || 4.4

Playoffs

|-
| style="text-align:left;"|1999
| style="text-align:left;"|Sacramento
| 5 || 0 || 14.8 || .667 ||  || .600 || 2.2 || .2 || .8 || 1.2 || 3.0
|-
| style="text-align:left;"|2000
| style="text-align:left;"|Sacramento
| 5 || 0 || 14.0 || .563 ||  || .333 || 3.2 || .2 || .4 || .2 || 4.0
|-
| style="text-align:left;"|2001
| style="text-align:left;"|Sacramento
| 8 || 0 || 17.6 || .633 ||  || .588 || 6.9 || .3 || .1 || .9 || 6.0
|-
| style="text-align:left;"|2002
| style="text-align:left;"|Sacramento
| 15 || 0 || 12.9 || .525 ||  || .667 || 3.5 || .2 || .5 || .3 || 3.3
|-
| style="text-align:left;"|2003
| style="text-align:left;"|Sacramento
| 8 || 0 || 11.4 || .292 ||  || .769 || 3.8 || .3 || .1 || .9 || 3.0
|-
| style="text-align:left;"|2004
| style="text-align:left;"|Indiana
| 3 || 0 || 4.3 || .000 ||  || .500 || 1.3 || .0 || .3 || .0 || .7
|-
| style="text-align:left;"|2005
| style="text-align:left;"|Indiana
| 9 || 0 || 7.4 || .400 ||  || .500 || 1.2 || .1 || .1 || .0 || 1.4
|-
| style="text-align:left;"|2006
| style="text-align:left;"|Indiana
| 4 || 0 || 3.8 || .000 ||  ||  || 1.3 || .0 || .3 || .0 || .0
|-
| style="text-align:left;"|2007
| style="text-align:left;"|Cleveland
| 3 || 0 || 1.0 ||  ||  ||  || .0 || .0 || .0 || .0 || .0
|- class="sortbottom"
| style="text-align:center;" colspan="2"|Career
| 60 || 0 || 11.1 || .496 || .000 || .610 || 3.1 || .2 || .3 || .4 || 2.9

Notes

External links

1975 births
Living people
American men's basketball players
Basketball players from San Diego
Basketball players from Utah
Basketball players from Washington (state)
Boston Celtics players
Centers (basketball)
Cleveland Cavaliers players
Detroit Pistons draft picks
Detroit Pistons players
Indiana Pacers players
Kansas Jayhawks men's basketball players
Parade High School All-Americans (boys' basketball)
People from Kennewick, Washington
People from Murray, Utah
Power forwards (basketball)
Sacramento Kings players
Survivor (American TV series) contestants